Hieronym Anthony “Harry” Jacunski (October 20, 1915 – February 20, 2003) was a National Football League (NFL) player and college football coach for over 40 years.

Jacunski was an All-state center on the New Britain High School 1934 basketball team and played football with Vince Lombardi at Fordham University, where Jacunski was one of Fordham's "Seven Blocks of Granite". In 1938 he was co-captain of the Fordham football team where he started as end.

He played in the NFL for six seasons (1939 – 1944) as defensive end for the Green Bay Packers, who were NFL champions in 1939 and 1944.

In 1945 he started a 35-year coaching career: one year at University of Notre Dame, two years at Harvard University, and the last 33 years at Yale University. Jacunski was inducted into both the Fordham and Green Bay Packers Hall of Fame.

External links

 

1915 births
2003 deaths
Sportspeople from New Britain, Connecticut
Players of American football from Connecticut
American football defensive ends
Fordham Rams football players
Green Bay Packers players
Notre Dame Fighting Irish football coaches
Harvard Crimson football coaches
Yale Bulldogs football coaches